The Midwest Invasion of 1967 (August 9 – September 20, 1967) codenamed Operation Torch. was a military operation between Nigerian and Biafran military forces during the Nigerian Civil War. The invasion began on August 9 when 3,000 Biafran soldiers led by General Victor Banjo crossed the River Niger Bridge into Asaba. Upon reaching Agbor, the Biafrans split up. With the 12th Battalion moving west capturing Benin City and Ore, the 18th Battalion swung south, taking Warri, Sapele and Ughelli, while the 13th Battalion headed north for Auchi, Agenebode and Okene. Simultaneously, a plot to capture Mid-Western Governor David Ejoor at his home in Benin failed. Nevertheless, the Biafrans, meeting virtually no resistance, had seized the entire Mid-Western Region in less than 12 hours.

Plans were drawn for the 12th Battalion to continue its advance towards Lagos and Ibadan. However, it was cripplingly delayed due to arguments between Ojukwu and Victor Banjo on whom to appoint as governor of the Mid-West, giving Gowon enough time to assemble a defensive line in the west. Also, during the occupation there was widespread hostility between native Urhobo-Isoko, Ijoid and Itsekiri people against the occupying Igbo soldiers. Igbo and native militia groups launched hit and run and reprisal raids against each other. In an attempt to ease tension, Ojukwu proclaimed the Republic of Benin (1967) under governor Albert Okonkwo on September 19, only for Nigerian troops to enter Benin the next day on the 20th, ending the new republic's 24 hour span.

The Biafran situation rapidly deteriorated following a Nigerian attack by Murtala Muhammed's 2nd Division at Ore, forcing the Biafrans to immediately retreat. In a large pincer movement, another Nigerian force headed south from Auchi towards Benin, as Benjamin Adekunle's 3rd Marine Commando division landed at Warri and promptly took Ughelli and Sapele. Benin was liberated in a three pronged attack from North, West and South which met little resistance. Biafran troops that were able to retreat fled across the Niger River Bridge into Biafra, destroying it afterwards. Those that were cut off abandoned their weaponry and uniforms and blended into the civilian population until it was safe to return east.

The Biafran retreat from Ore is considered the turning point of the war.

Background

Pre-War Events

Following the 1966 Nigerian coup d'état and the subsequent 1966 Nigerian counter-coup, a wave of resentment and hostility against Igbos because of their involvement in the former coup culminated in the 1966 anti-Igbo pogrom in which 30,000 Igbos and easterners have been estimated to have been killed. Following the erosion of military discipline and trust caused by the killings, a new regional military structure was formed with Military districts in the four regions (Northern, Western, Mid-Western, and Eastern) of the country. However, this raised problems as the ethnic structure of the Mid-Western military was heavily lopsided towards the Midwestern Igbos, who not only made up a sizable portion of troops, but over 75% of the 42 Mid-western officers were Igbo. In an attempt to prevent abuse of power, Ejoor refused to allow a group consisting of Yon DaKolo and Lt. Col. Mike Okwechime from importing weapons, instead choosing to ask the federal government for weapons directly, of which they sent a small amount of Mark V rifles for the 300 soldiers in the area. This, along with the lack of effort to raise any new troops left the Mid-Western region in an incapacitated state by the time the Biafrans invaded in 1967.

At the September 1966 constitutional conference for the future of the country, the Midwest was the only region in favor of a strong federation. Seeing that the oil, cocoa and palm oil rich region would quickly find itself a target of expansionist leanings by its larger, more powerful and consolidated neighbors. This was disagreed upon by many Midwestern Igbo officers, who believed the confederate and secessionist proposals by the other regions were a better approach to the issue, but this was dismissed by Ejoor and his cabinet. Further negotiations were held in Aburi and Benin. Even so, differences in the interpretation in these accords led to an even greater divide between Ojukwu and the Federal Government, later leading to Biafra's declaration of independence on May 30, 1967.

Post-war Events
During a June 7 military conference in Lagos following the Biafran declaration of independence, Ejoor was told "Midwestern State will be kept free from active operations unless where necessary, but the border between the Eastern States and the Midwest will be completely sealed off." Later in a speech in Asaba, Ejoor reiterated that the midwest would not be sucked into a war between the East and the North. This was followed by a redeployment of Federal troops away from Okene. By the time of the start of the invasion, there was only a token force of 300 troops in the entire Mid-Western military command.

After Nsukka fell to the Nigerian Army on July 14 during Operation UNICORD, President Odumegwu Ojukwu knew that the Nigerian Army would next set their sights on the Biafran capital of Enugu. After a mission to recapture Nsukka on July 30 failed and resulted in death of Major Kaduna Nzeogwu, Ojukwu began drawing up plans for an invasion of Nigeria's Mid-Western Region in an attempt to divert attention away from Enugu, as well as to perhaps bring a quick end to the war. In Ojukwu's words: "Our motive was not territorial ambition or the desire of conquest. We went into the Midwest purely in an effort to seize the serpent by the head; every other activity in that Republic was subordinated to that single aim. We were going to Lagos to seize the villain Gowon, and we took necessary military precautions.

Invasion

On the night of August 8, a Biafran assault company landed at John Holt Beach in Asaba. Within minutes they had captured the post office and catering Rest House, and had disconnected all major communication lines in the city. At 3a.m. on August 9, 1967 after a signal was given, a 3000 strong mobilized rifle brigade of Biafran soldiers under General Victor Banjo crossed the River Niger Bridge at Onitsha and entered Asaba, the core of what was to be the 101st division, dubbed the "Liberation Army of Nigeria" and "Midwest Expeditionary Force" with Lt. Col Emmanuel Ifeajuna as its Chief of Staff, and Joe Isichie as its quartermaster general. When the Biafrans reached Agbor they split into three fronts. With the Biafran 12th Battalion under Lt. Col. Festus Akagha moving west to Benin City, which was captured with little opposition as Biafran soldiers fired their weapons into the air upon entering the city. The 18th Battalion under Major Humphrey Chukwuka made its way into the oil-rich Niger Delta, towards Warri, Sapele and Ughelli, while the 13th Battalion under Col. Mike Inveso swung northwards towards Auchi and Agenebode. By August 13, they succeeded in also taking Okene, Iloshi and Atanai. A detachment was also sent to Jebba to destroy a bridge over the Niger River there. The 13th Battalion was given the job of defending the Biafran north flank while also cutting off Nigerian supplies going to Nsukka. A Nigerian Army unit was pursued by Biafran soldiers to the Siluko River where the two sides exchanged fire, before the Nigerians managed to escape under the cover of darkness. Unbeknownst to General Banjo a unit of Biafran soldiers under Midwestern Lt. Col. Ochei attacked the government residence of Mid-Western Region governor David Ejoor in Benin on the orders of President Odumegwu Ojukwu to capture Ejoor dead or alive. Fortunately for Ejoor, Quartermaster Lt. Col. Ogbemudia changed the guard detail at the government house the night prior, replacing troops that were in on the plot to hand over Ejoor. His guards resisted the attacking Biafrans which gave Ejoor enough time to escape and flee to Lagos. Within 12 hours of the initial invasion the Biafran Army had control over the entire Mid-Western Region, most of it taken without a fight.

The 12th Battalion was transformed into the 12th Brigade and given the job of quickly capturing Ibadan and Lagos from two axes at the towns of Ore and Okitipupa but this was postponed for three days while President Ojukwu and General Banjo argued over whom to appoint Governor/Administrator of the Mid-Western Region. Not wanting to appoint an Igbo over non-Igbo citizens General Banjo suggested that either David Ejoor, Samuel Ogbemudia, or Col. Trimnell be made governor but Ojukwu refused and ultimately placed the Midwest Igbo medical-officer Albert Okonkwo governor. When General Banjo returned to Benin City on August 12 he resumed the extremely delayed advance of the 12th Brigade to make its way to the town of Ore but not to attack Ibadan or Lagos until further notice. In Warri, Major Chukwuka released Major Adewale Ademoyega, who had been recently transferred from Uyo to Warri after getting into a fistfight with Major Emannuel Ifeajuna. After seizing all the weapons in Warri police station he made his way to Benin City, where he was put in command of the newly formed 19th Battalion, which consisted of 700 recently conscripted soldiers meant to support the new 12th brigade at Benin. The next day Major Ademoyega relieved Ifeajuna of his command and replaced him with Lt. Col. Henry Igboba. Ifeajuna then returned to Enugu as the 101st division's liaison officer.

Occupation

After being appointed as Governor of the Midwest on August 17, Okonkwo the same day installed a dusk to dawn curfew in which only citizens with passes would be allowed to move freely at night, along with other measures equivalent to martial law. The administration was structured in to empower those who supported the invasion, rather than the traditional seniority hierarchy. Local governments in the area were directed to donate materials to Enugu to support the war effort. Salt was rationed because of its use for explosive making. The loss of northern supply of cattle caused meat to be rationed as well. Shortages of other goods soon came about. However, not all of the supplies were distributed fairly among the people.

The opinion of the mid westerners towards the Igbos prior to the invasion was indifferent if not negative. Festus Okotie-Eboh, arguably the most influential Midwestern politician at the time, was murdered in the Igbo dominated 1966 Nigerian coup d'état. Non-Igbo citizens, especially the Hausa community, were subject to harassment, assault, and murder from Biafran soldiers while women were often molested and sometimes raped, in retaliation for the 1966 anti-Igbo pogrom. Resistance groups began springing up constantly consisting of mainly ethnic Urhobos and Ijaws. Because of a series of uprisings against the occupying Biafrans in Benin City, General Okonkwo began raising a force of loyal native inhabitants to combat the rebels. By August 18 Okonkwo had assembled a force of 780 reliable volunteers to keep natives from attacking or killing Biafran soldiers. Loyal inhabitants donated whatever weaponry they had to the Biafrans, which consisted mainly of single-shot rifles and double-barreled shotguns. Cooks began poisoning Biafran soldiers whenever they had the chance to and it was because of this that Biafran soldiers began only eating food that was cooked by ethnic Igbos or self-cooked. Rebellious natives who did not wish to fight would often seduce Biafran soldiers to get information out of them and tell Nigerian authorities. On August 20 a group of Urhobo/Ijaw rebels raided a Biafran camp and were successful in killing 50 soldiers while 16 rebels were killed in the skirmish. Due to these rebellions Biafran soldiers began raiding and pillaging villages throughout both the Mid-Western Region and Niger Delta inhabited by anyone other than Igbo civilians. The Biafran government began broadcasting Biafran propaganda in the region while the Nigerian government broadcast anti-Biafran propaganda as well. On September 19 President Ojukwu declared Governor Okonkwo President of the Biafran puppet-state, the Republic of Benin, in an attempt to make citizens of the Mid-Western Region loyal to a government other than Nigeria.

Turning the tide

On September 20, while the Biafran 12th Brigade was stationed in Ore, the Nigerian 2nd Division under Lt. Colonel Murtala Muhammed attacked the Biafrans and almost immediately forced them to retreat. The retreating Biafrans destroyed the Oluwa Bridge and managed to get a vital head-start in front of the advancing Nigerians. When the 12th Brigade reached Benin City they alerted their comrades, and instead of mounting a defense, the Biafran troops began looting the city, even stealing $5.6 million from the Central Bank. When the Nigerian 2nd Division arrived in Benin City they discovered the city largely abandoned but managed to find a trapped Biafran unit stationed in the Benin Prison, most of whom were killed attempting to escape. Meanwhile, the Nigerian 3rd Marine Division under Colonel Benjamin Adekunle began landing in Warri and captured it along with Sapele and Ughelli. Most Biafran soldiers trapped behind enemy lines abandoned their uniforms and weapons before integrating into the local communities, escaping eastward when they had the chance.

Aftermath

The Nigerian 2nd Division continued to pursue the Biafrans but were stopped after retreating Biafran soldiers detonated and collapsed the River Niger Bridge at Onitsha. On October 7, 1967, citizens of Asaba were forced to leave their homes and attend a public dance in Asaba. When the civilians arrived in downtown Asaba they were massacred by the 2nd Division, under the supervision of Lt. Colonel Murtala Muhammed, in retaliation for the assassination of Ahmadu Bello at the hands of Kaduna Nzeogwu one year earlier. This massacre became known as the Asaba massacre. The 2nd Division then invaded Onitsha and managed to capture and hold onto control of the city for less than a day before they were surrounded and massacred by Biafran soldiers.

References
Notes

Sources
 

Nigerian Civil War
Battles involving Nigeria
1967 in Nigeria
Conflicts in 1967
August 1967 events in Africa
September 1967 events in Africa